Kvasov may refer to:

Kvasov, a Russian-language surname
Kvašov a village in Slovakia